The Thomas E. Hart House and Kalmia Gardens is a  property in Hartsville, South Carolina, that was listed on the U.S. National Register of Historic Places in 1991.  The house was built in 1817.

References

Houses on the National Register of Historic Places in South Carolina
Houses completed in 1817
Houses in Hartsville, South Carolina
National Register of Historic Places in Darlington County, South Carolina
Historic districts on the National Register of Historic Places in South Carolina